The Hasbrouck Heights School District is a comprehensive community public school district that serves students in pre-kindergarten through twelfth grade from Hasbrouck Heights and Teterboro, in Bergen County, New Jersey, United States. The district serves students from Teterboro, a non-operating district that was merged into the Hasbrouck Heights School District following its dissolution on July 1, 2010.

As of the 2020–21 school year, the district, comprised of four schools, had an enrollment of 1,745 students and 145.0 classroom teachers (on an FTE basis), for a student–teacher ratio of 12.0:1.

The district is classified by the New Jersey Department of Education as being in District Factor Group "FG", the fourth-highest of eight groupings. District Factor Groups organize districts statewide to allow comparison by common socioeconomic characteristics of the local districts. From lowest socioeconomic status to highest, the categories are A, B, CD, DE, FG, GH, I and J.

Awards and recognition
For the 2005-06 school year, Lincoln School was one of 22 schools statewide selected as Governor's School of Excellence Winners, an award given to schools that have demonstrated significant improvement over the previous two academic years.

Schools
Schools in the district (with 2020–21 enrollment data from the National Center for Education Statistics) are:
Elementary schools
Euclid Elementary School with 338 students in grades PreK-5
Michael Sickels, Principal
Lincoln Elementary School with 386 students in grades PreK-5
Joseph C. Colangelo, Principal
Middle school
Hasbrouck Heights Middle School with 426 students in grades 6-8
Joseph Mastropietro, Principal
High school
Hasbrouck Heights High School with 558 students in grades 9-12
Linda Simmons, Principal

Administration
Core members of the district's administration are:
Dr. Matthew Helfant, Superintendent
Dina Messery, Business Administrator / Board Secretary

Board of education
The district's board of education is comprised of nine members who set policy and oversee the fiscal and educational operation of the district through its administration. As a Type II school district, the board's trustees are elected directly by voters to serve three-year terms of office on a staggered basis, with three seats up for election each year held (since 2012) as part of the November general election. The board appoints a superintendent to oversee the day-to-day operation of the district.

References

External links

 
School Data for the Hasbrouck Heights School District, National Center for Education Statistics

Hasbrouck Heights, New Jersey
New Jersey District Factor Group FG
School districts in Bergen County, New Jersey
Teterboro, New Jersey